(Charles) David (Stewart) Woodhouse (b 4 June 1949) was Archdeacon of Warrington from 1981  to 2001.

Woodhouse was educated at Silcoates School, Wakefield,  Kelham Theological College; and Lancaster University. (MA 1995) After a curacy at  St Wilfrid's, Halton, Leeds he was Youth Chaplain in Kirkby before a stint in Bermuda at Pembroke Parish. He was General Secretary of the Church of England Men's Society from 1970 to 1976 then  Rector  of Ideford and Domestic Chaplain to  the Bishop of Exeter from  1976 to 1981.

Notes

1934 births
People educated at Silcoates School
Alumni of Kelham Theological College
Alumni of Lancaster University
Archdeacons of Warrington
Living people